Ning Qin (born 7 January 1992) is a Chinese freestyle skier. She was born in Jiangsu. She  competed at the 2014 Winter Olympics in Sochi, where she qualified for the moguls finals.

References

External links

1992 births
Living people
Freestyle skiers at the 2014 Winter Olympics
Chinese female freestyle skiers
Olympic freestyle skiers of China
Sportspeople from Xuzhou
Asian Games medalists in freestyle skiing
Freestyle skiers at the 2011 Asian Winter Games
Asian Games bronze medalists for China
Medalists at the 2011 Asian Winter Games
Skiers from Jiangsu
Competitors at the 2015 Winter Universiade
21st-century Chinese women